Bruno Miguel de Sousa Silva (born 15 May 1996), known as Bruno Sousa, is a Portuguese footballer who plays for Fafe mainly as a right back.

Club career
Born in Paredes, Sousa joined Paços de Ferreira in 2008 from local Parendes, going on complete his formation at the former club. He made his first-team – and Primeira Liga – debut on 2 March 2015, playing the full 90 minutes and being booked in a 1–0 away win against Belenenses.

On 6 July 2021, he signed a two-year contract with Vilafranquense.

References

External links

Portuguese League profile 

1996 births
People from Paredes, Portugal
Sportspeople from Porto District
Living people
Portuguese footballers
Portugal youth international footballers
Association football defenders
F.C. Paços de Ferreira players
U.D. Oliveirense players
Gondomar S.C. players
S.C. Praiense players
Casa Pia A.C. players
U.D. Vilafranquense players
AD Fafe players
Primeira Liga players
Liga Portugal 2 players
Campeonato de Portugal (league) players